Gnorimosphaeroma is a genus of isopod crustaceans, containing the following species:

Gnorimosphaeroma akanense Nunomura, 1998
Gnorimosphaeroma albicauda Nunomura, 2005
Gnorimosphaeroma anchialos Jang & Kwon, 1993
Gnorimosphaeroma boninense Nunomura & Satake, 2006
Gnorimosphaeroma chinense (Tattersall, 1921)
Gnorimosphaeroma hachijoense Nunomura, 1999
Gnorimosphaeroma hoestandtli Kim & Kwon, 1985
Gnorimosphaeroma hokurikuense Nunomura, 1998
Gnorimosphaeroma insulare (Van Name, 1940)
Gnorimosphaeroma iriei Nunomura, 1998
Gnorimosphaeroma izuense Nunomura, 2007
Gnorimosphaeroma kurilense Kussakin, 1974
Gnorimosphaeroma naktongense Kwon & Kim, 1987
Gnorimosphaeroma noblei Menzies, 1954
Gnorimosphaeroma oregonensis (Dana, 1853)
Gnorimosphaeroma ovatum (Gurjanova, 1933)
Gnorimosphaeroma paradoxa (Nunomura, 1988)
Gnorimosphaeroma pulchellum Nunomura, 1998
Gnorimosphaeroma rayi Hoestlandt, 1969
Gnorimosphaeroma rebunense Nunomura, 1998
Gnorimosphaeroma shikinense Nunomura, 1999
Gnorimosphaeroma tondaense Nunomura, 1999
Gnorimosphaeroma tsutshimaense Nunomura, 1998

References

Sphaeromatidae